The Communist Party of Nepal (Masal) (1999) was a communist party in Nepal led by Deena Nath Sharma. It was formed on April 6, 1999, by activists splitting away from the Communist Party of Nepal (Masal). Sharma's faction called for the boycott of elections and urged its followers to support the armed struggle being led by the Communist Party of Nepal (Maoist). The party was later absorbed by the Maoists, Sharma becoming a member of their politburo.

See also
 List of communist parties in Nepal

Defunct communist parties in Nepal
Political parties established in 1999
1999 establishments in Nepal